The University of Kentucky College of Fine Arts is composed of four academic units: the School of Art and Visual Studies, the Department of Arts Administration, the School of Music, and the Department of Theatre and Dance. The Singletary Center for the Arts, the college's performing arts facility, supports the School of Music. The University of Kentucky Art Museum has a collection of more than 4,500 objects.

Departments and degree programs

Art & Visual Studies
 BA in Art Education
 BA in Art History and Visual Studies
 BA in Art Studio
 BFA in Art Studio
 BS in Digital Media Design
 MA in Art History and Visual Studies
 MA in Art Education
 MFA in Art Studio
 MFA in Curatorial Studies

Music

Undergraduate:
 BM in Music Education
 BM in Performance
 BA in Music
Graduate:
 MA in Musicology & Ethnomusicology
 MA in Music Theory
 MM in Music Therapy
 MM in Composition
 MM in Performance
 MM in Conducting
 MM in Sacred Music
 MM in Music Education
 PhD in Musicology & Ethnomusicology
 PhD in Music Education
 PhD in Music Theory
 DMA in Conducting
 DMA in Performance
 DMA in Composition
 Certificate in Music Theory Pedagogy
 Graduate Certificate in Orff Schulwerk

Theatre & Dance
 BA in Theatre
 BA in Dance
 Musical Theatre Certificate

Arts Administration
 BA in Arts Administration
 MA in Arts Administration
 PhD in Arts Administration
 Certificate in Fundraising and Development

Minors
 Art History
 Art Studio
 Digital Media Design
 Photography
 Visual Studies
 Music Theory and History
 Music Performance (audition required)
 Theatre
 Dance
 Interdisciplinary Minor in the Arts

Deans of the college

 J. Robert Wills, 1978-1982
 Richard Domek, 1982-1992 
 Rhoda-Gale Pollack, 1992-1998
 Robert Shay, 1998-2010
 Michael S. Tick, 2010–2016
 David Sogin (Interim) 2016-2017
 Mark Shanda, 2017–present

References

Fine Arts
Educational institutions established in 1865
Arts organizations established in 1865